Deutsch-les-Landes is a ten-part French-German comedy series.

Plot 
Martine, the mayor of Jiscalosse, a small village in the Landes, Nouvelle-Aquitaine, France, sells a part of the municipal lands to a German CEO, Gerhard Jäger, to avoid the bankruptcy of the municipality. The CEO then decides to relocate the whole of his firm to the village.

Cast 
Marie-Anne Chazel : Martine
Christoph Maria Herbst : Gerhard Jäger
Roxane Duran : Chloé
Sylvie Testud : Odile
Sebastian Schwarz : Karsten
Jasmin Schwiers : Marion
Sophie Mounicot : Ghyslaine
Philippe Lelièvre : Guillaume
Éric Métayer : Jean-Michel

References

External links 

French television series
German television series
2010s French television miniseries
2010s German television series